The 2007 season was Malmö FF's 96th in existence, their 72nd season in Allsvenskan and their 7th consecutive season in the league. They competed in Allsvenskan where they finished in 9th position and Svenska Cupen where they were knocked out in the third round. The result in Allsvenskan was the club's worst league performance since the 2001 season when they also finished 9th, as a result of this, manager Sören Åkebys contract was not renewed and Roland Nilsson was announced as the new Malmö FF manager in October 2007.

Players

Squad

Squad stats

Club

Coaching staff

Other information

Competitions

Overall

Allsvenskan

League table

Results summary

Results by round

Matches
Kickoff times are in CEST.

Svenska Cupen

Kickoff times are in CEST.

Non competitive

Pre-season

Mid-season

Malmö FF seasons
Malmo FF
Malmo FF